The proletariat is the social class of wage-earners, those members of a society whose only possession of significant economic value is their labour power (their capacity to work). A member of such a class is a proletarian. Marxist philosophy considers the proletariat to be exploited under capitalism, forced to accept meager wages in return for operating the means of production, which belong to the class of business owners, the bourgeoisie.

Marx argued that this oppression gives the proletariat common economic and political interests that transcend national boundaries, impelling them to unite and take over power from the capitalist class, and eventually to create a communist society free from class distinctions.

Roman Republic and Empire 

The  constituted a social class of Roman citizens who owned little or no property. The name presumably originated with the census, which Roman authorities conducted every five years to produce a register of citizens and their property, which determined their military duties and voting privileges. Those who owned 11,000  or fewer fell below the lowest category for military service, and their children— (offspring)—were listed instead of property; hence the name  (producer of offspring). Officially, propertyless citizens were called  because they were "persons registered not as to their property...but simply as to their existence as living individuals, primarily as heads of a family."

In battle, the cavalry brought their horses and arms, the top infantry class full arms and armor, the next two classes less, the fourth class only spears, the fifth slings, while the assisting adsidui held no weapons. In voting, the cavalry and top infantry class were enough to decide an issue; as voting started at the top, issues were usually decided before the lower classes voted.

After the Second Punic War in 201 BC, the Jugurthine War and various conflicts in Macedonia and Asia reduced the number of Roman family farmers, and the Republic experienced a shortage of propertied citizen soldiers.

Modern use

In the early 19th century, many Western European liberal scholars — who dealt with social sciences and economics — pointed out the socio-economic similarities of the modern rapidly growing industrial worker class and the classic proletarians. One of the earliest analogies can be found in the 1807 paper of French philosopher and political scientist Hugues Felicité Robert de Lamennais. Later it was translated to English with the title "Modern Slavery".

Swiss liberal economist and historian  was the first to apply the proletariat term to the working class created under capitalism, and whose writings were frequently cited by Karl Marx. Marx most likely encountered the term while studying the works of Sismondi.

Marxist theory

Marx, who studied Roman law at the Friedrich Wilhelm University of Berlin, used the term proletariat in his socio-political theory (Marxism) to describe a progressive working class untainted by private property and capable of revolutionary action to topple capitalism and abolish social classes, leading society to ever higher levels of prosperity and justice.

Marx defined the proletariat as the social class having no significant ownership of the means of production (factories, machines, land, mines, buildings, vehicles) and whose only means of subsistence is to sell their labor power for a wage or salary.

Marxist theory only vaguely defines the borders between the proletariat and adjacent social classes. In the socially superior, less progressive direction are the lower petty bourgeoisie, such as small shopkeepers, who rely primarily on self-employment at an income comparable to an ordinary wage. Intermediate positions are possible, where wage-labor for an employer combines with self-employment. In another direction, the lumpenproletariat or "rag-proletariat", which Marx considers a retrograde class, live in the informal economy outside of legal employment: the poorest outcasts of society such as beggars, tricksters, entertainers, buskers, criminals and prostitutes. Socialist parties have often argued over whether they should organize and represent all the lower classes, or only the wage-earning proletariat.

According to Marxism, capitalism is based on the exploitation of the proletariat by the bourgeoisie: the workers, who own no means of production, must use the property of others to produce goods and services and to earn their living. Workers cannot rent the means of production (e.g. a factory or department store) to produce on their own account; rather, capitalists hire workers, and the goods or services produced become the property of the capitalist, who sells them at market.

Part of the net selling price pays the workers' wages (variable costs); a second part renews the means of production (constant costs, capital investment); while the third part is consumed by the capitalist class, split between the capitalist's personal profit and fees to other owners (rents, taxes, interest on loans, etc.). The struggle over the first part (wage rates) puts the proletariat and bourgeoisie into irreconcilable conflict, as market competition pushes wages inexorably to the minimum necessary for the workers to survive and continue working. The second part, called capitalized surplus value, is used to renew or increase the means of production (capital), either in quantity or quality. The second and third parts are known as surplus value, the difference between the wealth the proletariat produce and the wealth they consume

Marxists argue that new wealth is created through labor applied to natural resources. The commodities that proletarians produce and capitalists sell are valued not for their usefulness, but for the amount of labor embodied in them: for example, air is essential but requires no labor to produce, and is therefore free; while a diamond is much less useful, but requires hundreds of hours of mining and cutting, and is therefore expensive. The same goes for the workers' labor power: it is valued not for the amount of wealth it produces, but for the amount of labor necessary to keep the workers fed, housed, sufficiently trained, and able to raise children as new workers. On the other hand, capitalists earn their wealth not as a function of their personal labor, which may even be null, but by the juridical relation of their property to the means of production (e.g. owning a factory or farmland).

Marx argues that history is made by man and not destiny. The instruments of production and the working class that use the tools in order to produce are referred to as the moving forces of society. Over time, this developed into the levels of social class where the owners of resources joined to squeeze productivity out of the individuals who depended on their labor power. Marx argues that these relations between the exploiters and exploited results in different modes of production and the successive stages in history. These modes of production in which mankind gains power over nature is distinguished into 5 different systems: the Primitive Community, Slave State, Feudal State, Capitalist System, and finally the Socialist Society. The transition between these systems were all due to an increase in civil unrest among those who felt oppressed by a higher social class.

The contention with feudalism began once the merchants and guild artisans grew in numbers and power. Once they organized themselves, they began opposing the fees imposed on them by the nobles and clergy. This development led to new ideas and eventually established the Bourgeoisie class which Marx opposes. Commerce began to change the form of production and markets began to shift in order to support larger production and profits. This change led to a series of revolutions by the bourgeois which resulted in capitalism. Marx argues that this same model can and should be applied to the fight for the proletariat. Forming unions similar to how the merchants and artisans did will establish enough power to enact change. Ultimately, Marx’s theory of the proletarians struggle would eventually lead to the fall of capitalism and the emergence of a new mode of production, socialism.

Marx argued that the proletariat would inevitably displace the capitalist system with the dictatorship of the proletariat, abolishing the social relationships underpinning the class system and then developing into a communist society in which "the free development of each is the condition for the free development of all".

During the Chinese revolution, the concept of the proletariat emphasized having a proletarian class consciousness, rather than having proletarian social attributes (such as being an industrial worker). In this way of defining the proletariat, a proletarian class consciousness could be developed through a subjective standpoint with political education supplied by the Communist Party. This conception of the proletariat allowed for a Marxist theoretical framing under which the Chinese revolution could address the relative weakness of industrial working classes in China.  Exactly what constituted a proper proletarian class consciousness was subject to intellectual and political debate.

Proletarian culture
Marx argued that each social class had its characteristic culture and politics. The socialist states stemming from the Russian Revolution championed and created the official version of proletarian culture.

This was quite different from the working-class culture of capitalist countries, which tend to experience "prole drift" (proletarian drift), in which everything inexorably becomes commonplace and commodified by means of mass production, mass selling, mass communication and mass education. Examples include best-seller lists, films, and music made to appeal to the masses, and shopping malls.

See also

Notes

References

Further reading
 
 Hal Draper, Karl Marx's Theory of Revolution, Vol. 2; The Politics of Social Classes. (New York: Monthly Review Press 1978).

External links

 
Working class
Socialism
Marxism
Marxist theory
Measurements and definitions of poverty